Abrograptidae is an extinct family of graptolites from the Middle Ordovician.

Genera
List of genera from Maletz (2014):

†Abrograptus Mu, 1958
†Dinemagraptus Kozłowski, 1951
†Jiangshanites Mu & Qiao, 1962
†Metabrograptus Strachan, 1990
†Parabrograptus Mu & Qiao, 1962

References

Graptolites
Prehistoric hemichordate families